The Bom language (alternates: Bome; Bomo) is an endangered language of Sierra Leone.  It belongs to the Mel branch of the Niger–Congo language family and is particularly closely related to the Bullom So language.  Most speakers are bilingual in Mende. Use of the Bom language is declining among members of the ethnic group.

Speakers
The number of speakers range from 15 to 1669 (Census 2015) for Krim and 20 to a few hundred for Bom.

Classification
Bom is a Northern Bullom language. The Krim dialect (also known as Dilan Hassan) is considered by speakers to be distinct, as speakers have separate ethnic identities.

References

External links 
Bom entry in the UNESCO Red Book of Endangered Languages
EndangeredLanguages.com Profile for Bom
Bom Audio sample included in video on Endangered Languages

Bullom languages
Endangered languages of Africa
Languages of Sierra Leone